Go for It, Baby is a 1968 West German comedy film directed by May Spils and starring Werner Enke, Uschi Glas and Henry van Lyck.

The film won two German Film Awards. Location shooting took place in Munich.

Cast
 Werner Enke as Martin
 Uschi Glas as Barbara
 Henry van Lyck as Henry van Busch
 Rainer Basedow as Wachhabender im Polizeirevier
 Inge Marschall as Anita
 Helmut Brasch as Viktor Block
 Joachim Schneider as Wachtmeister
 Fritz Schuster as Bettler
 Johannes Buzalski as Spanner
 Horst Pasderski as Filmproduzent
 Ursula Bode
 Edith Volkmann as Hausmeisterin
  as Dichter im Fahrstuhl
 Erwin Dietzel as Zoo-Wärter
 Li Bonk as Blocks Sekretärin
 Barbara Schütz as Anitas Freundin
 Günter Strigel as Polizist 2
 Peter Tambosi as Polizist 1

Reception
The film was the highest-grossing in Switzerland in the second half of 1968.

References

Bibliography 
 Hake, Sabine. German National Cinema. Routledge, 2013.

External links 
 

1968 films
West German films
German comedy films
1968 comedy films
1960s German-language films
Films set in Munich
German black-and-white films
1968 directorial debut films
1960s German films